Anacampsis trifoliella is a moth of the family Gelechiidae. It is found in France, Italy and Switzerland.

The wingspan is about 12 mm.

References

Moths described in 1890
Anacampsis
Moths of Europe